Baeolidia harrietae is a species of sea slug, an aeolid nudibranch. It is a marine gastropod mollusc in the family Aeolidiidae.

Distribution
This species was described from the Great Barrier Reef, Australia. It has been reported from Papua New Guinea, the Philippines and the Ryukyu Islands, Japan.

Description
Baeolidia harrietae is an extremely flattened animal which hides on the surface of the colonial zoantharian Palythoa.

References

Aeolidiidae
Gastropods described in 1982